Farmington is an unincorporated community in Albemarle County, Virginia, United States.  Its elevation is 600 feet (183 m).

References

Unincorporated communities in Virginia
Unincorporated communities in Albemarle County, Virginia